Traffic Gold is a two-disc 2005 compilation album by the psychedelic rock band Traffic. It contains at least one song from each album except On the Road, Far from Home, and The Last Great Traffic Jam.

Reception

Allmusic gave the compilation a positive review, commenting, "While previous Island collections like Feelin' Alright: The Very Best of Traffic and 20th Century Masters - The Millennium Collection dutifully cover the radio essentials, Gold provides both newbies and longtime fans with a fully stocked buffet of fan favorites and album highlights."

Track listing

Disc one

 "Paper Sun" (Capaldi/Winwood) - 4.12
 "Dealer" (Capaldi/Winwood) - 3.10
 "Coloured Rain" (Capaldi/Winwood/Wood) - 2.39
 "Hole in My Shoe" (Mason) - 3.00
 "No Face, No Name, No Number" (Capaldi/Winwood) - 3.31
 "Heaven Is in Your Mind" (Capaldi/Winwood/Wood) - 4.15
 "Smiling Phases" (Capaldi/Winwood/Wood) - 2.39
 "Dear Mr. Fantasy" (Capaldi/Winwood/Wood) - 5.34
 "You Can All Join In" (Mason) - 3.35
 "Pearly Queen" (Capaldi/Winwood) - 4.18
 "Feelin' Alright" (Mason) - 4.16
 "Who Knows What Tomorrow May Bring" (Capaldi/Winwood/Wood) - 3.12
 "Forty Thousand Headmen" (Capaldi/Winwood) -  3.14
 "Shanghai Noodle Factory" (Capaldi/Fallon/Winwood/Wood) - 5.04
 "Medicated Goo" (Miller/Winwood) - 3.34
 "Glad" (Winwood) - 6.57
 "Freedom Rider" (Capaldi/Winwood) - 5.24
 "Empty Pages" (Capaldi/Winwood) - 4.33
 "John Barleycorn" (Traditional, arr. Winwood) - 6.21

Disc two

 "Gimme Some Lovin'" [Live] (Winwood/Winwood/Davis) - 9.00
 "The Low Spark of High-Heeled Boys" (Capaldi/Winwood) - 11.40
 "Light Up Or Leave Me Alone" (Capaldi) - 4.46
 "Rock and Roll Stew" (Gordon/Grech) - 6.08
 "Rainmaker" (Capaldi/Winwood) - 7.49
 "Shoot Out At The Fantasy Factory" (Capaldi/Winwood) - 6.01
 "(Sometimes I Feel So) Uninspired" (Capaldi/Winwood) - 7.32
 "Something New" (Capaldi/Winwood) - 3.15
 "Dream Gerrard" (Stanshall/Winwood) - 11.02
 "Walking In The Wind" (Capaldi/Winwood) - 6.51
 "When The Eagle Flies" (Capaldi/Winwood) - 4.21

References

Traffic (band) albums
Traffic
2005 compilation albums
Island Records compilation albums
Universal Music Group compilation albums